Siphona geniculata is a Palearctic species of fly in the family Tachinidae.

Distribution
Most of Europe, Russia, Japan.

Hosts
Tipulidae.

References

Tachininae
Diptera of Europe
Insects described in 1776
Taxa named by Charles De Geer